Adriano Baffi (born 7 August 1962) is a former Italian bicycle road racer. After his career as a rider, he became a team director. He is the son of Italian bicycle racer Pierino Baffi.

Baffi was born in Vailate, Italy.  He joined Luxembourg team  as a sporting director in 2011.

Major results

1980
 1st  National Junior Kilometer Championships
 1st  National Junior Team Pursuit Championships
1985 
 8th Milano–Torino
1987
 1st  National Points Race Championships
 1st Giro dell'Etna
 1st Stage 1 Tour de Suisse
 3rd Giro del Piemonte
 4th Overall Settimana Internazionale di Coppi e Bartali
1988
 1st  National Points Race Championships
 1st  Overall Settimana internazionale di Coppi e Bartali
1st Stages 2 & 4
 1st Milano–Vignola
 1st Giro di Campania
 1st Stage 5 Giro di Puglia
 Tirreno–Adriatico
 1st Stages 2 & 6a 
 2nd Criterium d'Abruzzo
 3rd Giro dell'Etna
1989
 1st Milano–Vignola
 1st Giro della Provincia di Reggio Calabria
 1st Stage 7a Paris–Nice
 1st Stage 2 Settimana internazionale di Coppi e Bartali
 Three Days of De Panne
 1st Stages 2 & 3
 3rd Milan–San Remo
 5th Paris–Tours
 7th Gent-Wevelgem
1990
 1st Giro dell'Etna
 1st Trofeo Pantalica
 1st Stage 2 Giro del Trentino
 1st Stage 5 Paris–Nice
 1st Stage 5 Settimana internazionale di Coppi e Bartali
 Giro d'Italia
 1st Stages 11 & 18 
 4th Overall Tour of Belgium
1st Stage 2
 8th Milan–San Remo
 10th Paris–Tours
1991
 3rd Giro dell'Etna
 4th Grand Prix of Aargau Canton
1992
 1st Stage 2 Giro del Trentino
 1st Stage 8 Paris–Nice
 3rd Gent-Wevelgem
1993
 Giro d'Italia
1st  Points classification
1st Stages 2, 8 & 18
 6th E3 Prijs Vlaanderen
 10th Gent-Wevelgem
1994
 1st Trofeo Luis Puig
 1st Monte Carlo–Alassio
 1st Stage 1 Tirreno–Adriatico
 1st Stage 1 Giro del Trentino
 1st Stage 2 Vuelta a Andalucía
 Ruta del Sol
 1st Stages 2, 3 & 6 
 Setmana Catalana de Ciclisme
 1st Stages 4 & 5a 
 3rd Milan–San Remo
 4th Scheldeprijs
 7th Overall Volta a la Comunitat Valenciana
 1st Stages 1, 3, 4 & 5 
1995
 1st  Overall Vuelta a Murcia
1st Stages 2 & 5 (ITT)
 1st Stage 19 Vuelta a España
 Ruta del Sol
 1st Stages 2 & 4 
 2nd Overall Vuelta a Mallorca
2nd Trofeo Manacor
2nd Trofeo Pantalica
2nd Trofeo Soller
3rd Trofeo Alcudia
 2nd GP Llodio
 2nd Ronde van Midden-Zeeland
 2nd Continental Classic
 3rd Dwars door Vlaanderen
 5th Overall Vuelta a Andalucía
 1st Stages 2 & 4 
 7th Paris–Tours
1996
 1st  Overall Circuit de la Sarthe
1st Stages 3 & 4 (ITT)
 1st Paris–Camembert
 2nd Cholet-Pays de Loire
 2nd Overall Giro di Sardegna
1st Stage 5
 2nd Overall Settimana Internazionale di Coppi e Bartali
 3rd Giro dell'Etna
1997
 1st Stage 6 Paris–Nice
 5th Overall Danmark Rundt
1998 
 9th Overall Giro di Puglia
1999
 1st  National Points Race Championships
2000
 1st GP Zele
2001
 1st Sindelfingen-Schleife

References

Living people
1962 births
Italian male cyclists
Italian Giro d'Italia stage winners
Italian Vuelta a España stage winners
Cyclists from the Province of Cremona
Tour de Suisse stage winners
20th-century Italian people